The 2011 Svenska Cupen (English: Swedish Cup) was the 56th season of Svenska Cupen, the main Swedish football Cup. It began on 5 March 2011 with the first match of the preliminary round and ended on 5 November with the Final. Helsingborgs IF won the cup after beating Kalmar FF 3–1 in the final, Helsingborg were also the defending champions. The winners of this competition earned a place in the second qualifying round of the 2012–13 UEFA Europa League, however the second round spot was awarded to Allsvenskan runners-up AIK since Helsingborg were already qualified for European cup play, Kalmar FF who were the runners-up of the cup were awarded AIKs previous qualification spot in the first round.

Teams

Preliminary round
52 teams from Division 1 2011 or lower of the Swedish league pyramid competed in this round. The matches took place between 5–26 March 2011.

!colspan="3"|5 March 2011

|-
!colspan="3"|12 March 2011

|-
!colspan="3"|13 March 2011

|-
!colspan="3"|15 March 2011

|-
!colspan="3"|16 March 2011

|-
!colspan="3"|17 March 2011

|-
!colspan="3"|19 March 2011

|-
!colspan="3"|20 March 2011

|-
!colspan="3"|26 March 2011

|}

Round 1
Twelve teams from Division 1 2011 or lower, two of three teams which earned promotion to Superettan 2011 (not Qviding FIF) and the bottom eight teams from Superettan 2010 entered in this round. They were joined by the 26 preliminary round winners. The matches of this round took place between 16 March–5 April 2011.

!colspan="3"|16 March 2011

|-
!colspan="3"|20 March 2011

|-
!colspan="3"|22 March 2011

|-
!colspan="3"|24 March 2011

|-
!colspan="3"|26 March 2011

|-
!colspan="3"|27 March 2011

|-
!colspan="3"|28 March 2011

|-
!colspan="3"|30 March 2011

|-
!colspan="3"|31 March 2011

|-
!colspan="3"|5 April 2011

|}

Round 2
Two demoted teams from Allsvenskan 2010 and six teams ranked 3rd through 8th in 2010 Superettan entered in this round, joining 24 winners from Round 1. The matches of this round took place between 6–27 April 2011.

!colspan="3"|6 April 2011

|-
!colspan="3"|7 April 2011

|-
!colspan="3"|19 April 2011

|-
!colspan="3"|20 April 2011

|-
!colspan="3"|21 April 2011

|-
!colspan="3"|26 April 2011

|-
!colspan="3"|27 April 2011

|}

Round 3
Sixteen teams from Allsvenskan 2011 entered in this round and joined the 16 winners of Round 2, the teams from Allsvenskan were seeded. The matches of this round took place on 10–18 May 2011. All times are in Central European Summer Time.

Round 4
The sixteen winning teams from round 3 entered in this round. The matches of this round took place on 29 May 2011. All times are in Central European Summer Time.

Quarter-finals
The four quarterfinal matches were originally scheduled to take place on 15 June.

Semi-finals
Both semifinal matches were scheduled to take place on 29 June 2011. However, on that date one of the quarter-finals still hadn't been played, so the semifinal matches were pushed forward.

Final
The final was played on 5 November 2011.

References

External links
 Official site 

2011
Cup
2011 domestic association football cups